Keith Matthew Thornton (born October 7, 1963), better known by his stage name Kool Keith, is an American rapper and record producer from The Bronx, New York City, known for his surreal, abstract and often profane or incomprehensible lyrics. Kool Keith has recorded prolifically both as a solo artist and in group collaborations. Kool Keith is generally considered to be one of hip-hop's most eccentric and unusual personalities.

Kool Keith was a cofounding member of Ultramagnetic MCs, whose debut Critical Beatdown was released in 1988. After two more albums with the group, Funk Your Head Up and The Four Horsemen, Kool Keith released his critically acclaimed solo debut album, Dr. Octagonecologyst under the name Dr. Octagon in 1996. He subsequently released a series of further independently released hip hop albums, including Sex Style, First Come, First Served (as Dr. Dooom), and most recently Keith.

After releasing only one album on a major label, Black Elvis/Lost in Space, Kool Keith subsequently returned to independently releasing music, producing further efforts as a solo artist and in collaboration with groups such as Analog Brothers, Masters of Illusion, Thee Undatakerz and Project Polaroid. Kool Keith has also made guest appearances in collaboration with Peeping Tom and Yeah Yeah Yeahs. He was also featured on the short track DDT on Jurassic 5's album Power in Numbers.
The Prodigy's hit "Smack My Bitch Up" was based on a sample of Kool Keith's voice saying "Change my pitch up. Smack my bitch up" on Give The Drummer Some by Ultramagnetic MC's.

History

Ultramagnetic MCs (1984–1993)
Kool Keith began his career with the group Ultramagnetic MCs. After the release of their influential 1988 album Critical Beatdown, Thornton was reportedly institutionalized in Bellevue Hospital Center. However, he later said that the idea that he was institutionalized came from a flippant remark made during an interview, and he never expected the story to become so well known.

After continuing with Ultramagnetic for two more albums (1992's Funk Your Head Up and 1993's The Four Horsemen), Thornton would embark on a solo career.

Dr. Octagon debuts (1995–1996)
Thornton released his first notable solo single, "Earth People", in 1995, under the name Dr. Octagon. This was followed by the release of Dr. Octagonecologyst the following year. The album's production by Dan the Automator and Kutmasta Kurt, with scratching by DJ Qbert was acclaimed by critics, and the album was released nationally by DreamWorks Records in 1997, after an initial release on the smaller Bulk Recordings label (as, simply, Dr. Octagon) a year prior. DreamWorks also issued an instrumental version of the album, titled Instrumentalyst (Octagon Beats).

Further releases (1997–1999)
Thornton followed the Dr. Octagonecologyst album with Sex Style in 1997, under the name Kool Keith.

In 1996, Thornton collaborated with Tim Dog for the single "The Industry is Wack", performing under the name Ultra—the album Big Time soon followed. In 1999, he released the album First Come, First Served under the name "Dr. Dooom", in which the album's main character killed off Dr. Octagon on the album's opening track. The same year, on August 10, 1999, Thornton released Black Elvis/Lost in Space. It peaked at #10 on the Billboard Heatseekers chart, #74 on the Top R&B/Hip-Hop Albums chart, and #180 on the Billboard 200, and stands as Thornton's most commercially successful project to date.

Collaborations (2000–2001)

On July 25, 2000, Thornton released the album Matthew. It peaked at #47 on the Billboard Heatseekers chart. The same year, Thornton collaborated with Ice-T, Marc Live, Black Silver and Pimp Rex for the album Pimp to Eat, under the group name Analog Brothers, with Keith performing as Keith Korg and Ice-T as Ice Oscillator.

On June 5, 2001, Thornton released the album Spankmaster on Gothom Records. It peaked at #16 on the Billboard Heatseekers chart, #11 on the Top Independent Albums	chart and #48 on the Top R&B/Hip-Hop Albums chart.

Second Dr. Octagon album (2002–2004)

In 2002, Thornton began recording The Resurrection of Dr. Octagon with producer Fanatik J, signing a contract with CMH Records to release the album, which was eventually completed without much input from Thornton, due to a falling out over contractual terms.

On October 12, 2004, Real Talk Entertainment issued the album Dr. Octagon Part 2. The album was discontinued by court order. On June 27, The Return of Dr. Octagon was released by OCD International, an imprint of CMH, advertised as the official follow-up to Dr. Octagonecologyst. Some critics felt that it was not as good as its predecessor. Thornton stated that he liked the album, but felt that it hurt his reputation as a musician. In August, Thornton performed under the Dr. Octagon billing, but did not acknowledge the release of the OCD album.

Further collaborations and solo albums (2002–present)
Thornton, Marc Live and H-Bomb formed the group KHM, releasing the album Game on November 19, 2002, changing their name to "Clayborne Family" by the release of their second album.

On April 25, 2006, Thornton released the album Nogatco Rd. under the name Mr. Nogatco.

In 2007, Ultramagnetic MCs released the reunion album  The Best Kept Secret. In 2009, Kool Keith released the concept album Tashan Dorrsett; a follow-up, The Legend of Tashan Dorrsett, followed two years later. In 2012, Kool Keith performed at the Gathering of the Juggalos. He has stated that he is considering retiring from music. In 2013, Keith appeared as Dr. Octagon on the Yeah Yeah Yeahs song "Buried Alive", from their album Mosquito. In 2015, Keith released "Time? Astonishing!" with producer L'Orange and began the start of his relationship with Mello Music Group. Since then, Keith also re-issued his group album with the Analog Brothers (Ice-T, Pimp Rex, Marc Live, Silver Synth) "Pimp To Eat" with Mello Music. Kool Keith's recent solo album Feature Magnetic was dropped on September 16, 2016 and it features MF DOOM, Slug from Atmosphere, Dirt Nasty and many others. Artwork for the "Feature Magnetic" album was produced by Marc Santo.

In 2018, Keith collaborated once again with Dan the Automator and DJ Qbert for another Dr. Octagon album. Moosebumps: An Exploration Into Modern Day Horripilation was released on streaming services on April 6, 2018, with the physical release scheduled for Record Store Day, April 21, 2018. The Record Store Day release includes both vinyl and CD copies. Using his Deltron persona, Del the Funky Homosapien guests on "3030 Meets the Doc, Pt. 1". NPR offered a first look at the album on March 29, 2018. Kool Keith appears on "Western" by the bluegrass-rap group Gangstagrass, performing as himself.

Thornton's fan site refers to his discography of roughly fifty album releases, most of which have been commercially released. Singles such as "Spectrum" continue to appear online under the artist's name, on sites such as SoundCloud and Spotify.

Lyrical and performance style

Thornton's lyrics are often abstract, surreal, and filled with non-sequiturs and profane humor. For example, "Technical Difficulties," from the album Dr. Octagonecologyst, contains the following lyrics: "Intestines, investments, hide money in your stomach / Who can stop Pepto-Bismol? Only a Gremlin eatin' in Larry Parker like Gizmo." Thornton is also known for an explicit style focusing on sexual themes, which Thornton has referred to as "pornocore". In a 2007 interview, Thornton claims to have "invented horrorcore".

Alter egos

Kool Keith is known for his many alter egos. As of 2012, Kool Keith had at least 58 such alter egos: these include well-known aliases such as Dr. Octagon, Dr. Dooom, and Black Elvis, which appeared on albums bearing their names; and the more obscure, such as "Exotron Geiger Counter One Plus Megotron." Some of Kool Keith's monikers have only existed on album artwork, such as "Mr. Green" and "Elvin Presley."

In reference to his relationship between himself and his various stage personalities, Keith has said, "I don't even feel like I'm a human being anymore".

Discography

Solo albums 

Dr. Octagonecologyst (1996)
Sex Style (1997)
First Come, First Served (1999)
Black Elvis/Lost in Space (1999)
Matthew (2000)
Spankmaster (2001)
Nogatco Rd. (2006)
The Return of Dr. Octagon (2006)
Dr. Dooom 2 (2008)
Tashan Dorrsett (2009)
Love & Danger (2012)
Demolition Crash (2014)
El Dorado Driven (2014)
Feature Magnetic (2016)
Moosebumps: An Exploration Into Modern Day Horripilation (2018)
Controller of Trap (2018)
Keith (2019)
Computer Technology (2019)
Saks 5th Ave (2019)

Collaborative albums

Big Time (with Tim Dog as Ultra) (1996)
The Cenobites (with Godfather Don as The Cenobites) (1997)
Pimp to Eat (with Ice-T, Black Silver, Marc Live and Pimpin' Rex as Analog Brothers) (2000)
A Much Better Tomorrow (with Dan The Automator) (2000)
Masters of Illusion (with KutMasta Kurt and Motion Man as Masters of Illusion) (2000)
Game (with Jacky Jasper and Marc Live as KHM) (2002)
Kool Keith Presents Thee Undatakerz (with M-Balmer, The Funeral Director and Al Bury-U as Thee Undatakerz) (2004)
Kool Keith Official Space Tape (with DJ Junkaz Lou)  (2004)
Diesel Truckers (with KutMasta Kurt as The Diesel Truckers) (2004)
Clayborne Family (with Jacky Jasper and Marc Live as Clayborne Family) (2004)
The Original SoundTrack Album of Project Polaroid (with TomC3 as Project Polaroid) (2006)
Idea of a Masterpiece (with 57-41) (2009)
Bikinis N Thongs (with Denis Deft) (2009)
Stoned (with H-Bomb as 7th Veil) (2009)
Magnetic Pimp Force Field (with Big Sche Eastwood) (2013)
Time? Astonishing! (with L'Orange) (2015) 
A Couple of Slices (with Ray West) (2015)
Moosebumps: An Exploration Into Modern Day Horripilation The SP 1200 Remixes (with Dan The Automator) (2018)
The Foundation Album (2019)
Space Goretex (with Thetan) (2020)

References

External links
 
 

1963 births
African-American male rappers
African-American songwriters
American hip hop record producers
Columbia Records artists
DreamWorks Records artists
Horrorcore artists
Living people
Rappers from the Bronx
Underground rappers
Songwriters from New York (state)
Songwriters from California
Guitarists from New York City
20th-century American bass guitarists
21st-century American rappers
American male bass guitarists
Record producers from New York (state)
20th-century American male musicians
21st-century American male musicians
African-American guitarists
20th-century African-American musicians
21st-century African-American musicians
American male songwriters